Abdulrahman Ahmed Jibril Baroud (‎ 1937 in Bayt Daras, Palestine – 17 April 2010 ) was a well-known Palestinian poet.

Biography
In 1948, when there was abandonment of his village, he and his family were captured by the IDF and settled in Jabalia refugee camp. The first poem wrote by Baroud was written while he was in primary school and it was about the battle of Bayt Daras. He studied in his village until the fifth grade primary, and even completed high school, moving between schools and refugee agencies in the Gaza Strip. He was sent for further study by the relief agency to complete his university studies in the Faculty of Arts at Cairo University. He received a bachelor's degree, and then won a scholarship from the University of Cairo to get his masters and doctorate degrees with honor grades. Afterwards, he moved to work at King Abdulaziz University in Jeddah as a professor. He wrote most of his poems while working for the university. He was killed in April 2010. He was married to an Egyptian woman, and was the father of six children.

Most famous works
هجوم السلام
يا تائهون على الدروب
ذكرى الخليل
عام مضى
أطلق يدي

References 

Adab.com
Alwatanyh

Palestinian male poets
1937 births
2010 deaths
20th-century Palestinian poets
20th-century male writers